The Catalan donkey ( or) is a breed of large domestic donkeys from the historic region of Catalonia, now in north-eastern Spain and south-western France. Approximately 80% of the breed population is in the modern autonomous community of Catalonia, and approximately 20% is in the historic Roussillon region of France.

History 

The Catalan breed is considered to be very old; Pliny the Elder mentions donkeys on the Plain of Vic, in the comarca of Osona. Some believe it to be related to the donkey of Mallorca and the Zamorano-Leonés donkey. 

The Catalan donkey originates in the basins of the Cardener, Segre and Ter rivers. In the past it was very important on farms but due to declining use and numbers the Catalan donkey was in danger of extinction. There were once as many as 50,000. 

A herd-book was established in 1880 or 1929. Numbers fell during the Spanish Civil War, but recovered in the next decade. In the 1960s and 1970s rural depopulation and the mechanisation of agriculture led to a new decline in numbers. Much of the credit for the recovery of the breed is given to one person, Joan Gassó i Salvans from the comarca of Berguedà. In 2004, 32% of the registered population of 336 were on his finca in Olvan. An official national genealogical herd-book was opened in 2002. At the end of 2013 the total population in Spain was recorded as 851. The Ministerio de Agricultura, Alimentación y Medio Ambiente, the Spanish ministry of agriculture, lists the breed as "in danger of extinction".

The Catalan donkey has been exported to many countries, among them Algeria, Congo, Madagascar, Tunisia and Zaire in Africa; Argentina, Brazil, Canada, Cuba and the United States in the Americas; and also Australia, Germany, India and the United Kingdom. It contributed to the history of European breeds including the Baudet de Poitou in France, and the Asino di Martina Franca and Asino di Pantelleria in Italy. In the United States it played an essential part in the development of the American Mammoth Jack: a Catalan jack known as Imported Mammoth, brought to Charleston in South Carolina in 1819, was widely used for breeding in parts of Kentucky, Missouri and Tennessee.

Characteristics 

Jacks average  in height, and jennies .

Use 

The traditional use of the Catalan was as a sire for mules. With the mechanisation of agriculture in the twentieth century, demand for mules fell precipitously, and Catalan jacks were no longer needed for this purpose. In the twenty-first century, possible uses for these donkeys include recreational tourism; use in vegetation management to clear underbrush in woodland, thus reducing the risk of fire; as a companion animal; and as an element of cultural heritage. Advocates of Catalan nationalism have adopted the Catalan donkey as a satirical response to the Toro de Osborne image widespread in other parts of Spain.

References 

Catalan symbols
National symbols of Spain
Donkey breeds